Maesteg railway station is one of two railway stations that serve the town of Maesteg in Wales. Passenger services are operated by Transport for Wales.

History

The station is now the terminus of the Maesteg Line from Cardiff via Bridgend. Previously the line continued northbound through the old Maesteg Castle Street railway station (opened in 1864), which closed with the withdrawal of passenger services in 1970. Mineral traffic had continued to several collieries in the areas until November 1985 (with the route remaining open past Llynfi North Junction as far north as Nantyffyllon to serve the NCB Maesteg Central Washery as well as the three pits) but the closure of the last remaining mine at St John's and the washery saw the line fall into disuse.

The former station platforms and footbridge still exist, although the track has now been removed and there is heavy tree and plant growth at the location.

Facilities
The station is unstaffed and has a single platform with waiting shelter, CIS display, customer help point, timetable information board and self-service ticket machine next to the main entrance. The latter can be used for collecting pre-paid tickets as well as for purchasing tickets prior to travel. Level access is available between the car park and platform. The platform was lengthened in 2008 to allow four-car trains to operate busier services. This was funded by the Welsh Assembly Government and the European Union.

Services
The general service pattern is one train per hour to Cardiff Central via Bridgend, with most trains extended to Cheltenham Spa via Newport, Chepstow, Lydney and Gloucester. One service a day starts from Chester.

References

External links 

RAILSCOT - Photographs of Maesteg
"Wales Rails - Bridgend to Maesteg Line"

Railway stations in Bridgend County Borough
DfT Category F1 stations
Railway stations opened by British Rail
Railway stations in Great Britain opened in 1992
Railway stations served by Transport for Wales Rail
Maesteg